Barbora Polcarová (born 24 July 2002) is a Czech footballer who plays as a midfielder for Sparta Prague.

She is a member of the Czech national team. She made her debut for the national team on 15 November 2022 in a friendly match against Romania.

References

External links
 
 
 

2002 births
Living people
Czech women's footballers
Women's association football midfielders
AC Sparta Praha (women) players
Czech Republic women's international footballers
Czech Women's First League players
FC Viktoria Plzeň players